Bufoides kempi is a species of true toad, family Bufonidae. This poorly known species is endemic to Meghalaya, Northeast India. Its common names are Kemp's Asian tree toad, Garo Hills toad, and Garo Hills tree toad. The specific name kempi honours Stanley Wells Kemp, an English zoologist and anthropologist.

Taxonomy and systematics
The species was described in 1919 by George Albert Boulenger as Nectophryne kempi. Thomas Barbour placed it in Pedostibes instead. In 2016, Chandramouli and Amarasinghe transferred it to Bufoides based on shared morphological characteristics with Bufoides meghalayanus. They might even represent the same species; however, new material would be needed to settle this question.

Description
The types measure  in snout–vent length; the smaller one is a sub-adult and both are unsexed. The snout is rounded. No tympanum is visible. The parotoid glands are oval. The fingers have basal webbing and the toes moderate webbing. Both the fingers and the toes bare small terminal discs. Skin is granular with small, scattered warts. The granulation is most intense on the flanks; the dorsal granules are larger than ventral ones. The preserved specimens are black ventrally; the larger one has olive brown dorsum whereas the smaller one is black throughout.

If the 36-mm specimen collected from Tura at around 2009 is Bufoides kempi, then it represents the largest known specimen and a recent record of this species.

Habitat and conservation
Little is known about the ecology and population status of this species. It probably breeds in streams. It is not known to occur in any protected area.

References

kempi
Frogs of India
Endemic fauna of India
Amphibians described in 1919
Taxa named by George Albert Boulenger
Taxobox binomials not recognized by IUCN